James W. Skotchdopole is an Academy Award-winning and Emmy nominated American film producer. Skotchdopole won a 2015 Best Picture Academy Award for his work producing Alejandro González Iñárritu's highly acclaimed Birdman or (The Unexpected Virtue of Ignorance). Skotchdopole's work on the film also resulted in an Independent Spirit Best Picture Award, a DGA Award, a PGA Award and a BAFTA Best Film Award nomination.

He again collaborated with Iñárritu and produced the 2016 multiple Oscar and Bafta-winning feature The Revenant, which earned Iñárritu an Oscar for Best Director and earned Leonardo DiCaprio a long-awaited Oscar's Best Actor Award.

Currently, Skotchdopole is co-executive producing Kilter Films / Amazon's new series called The Peripheral, from the William Gibson novel of the same name. Prior to that, Skotchdopole co-executive produced as well as received an Emmy Award nomination for the limited series Mrs. America starring Cate Blanchett for FX Networks. As an executive producer, he also prepared the motion picture franchise Call of Duty for Activision. Prior to that, he executive produced War Machine, starring Brad Pitt for Netflix.

A native New Yorker, Skotchdopole has been making films for some 39 years. He has worked on over 50 feature films in 17 different countries, earning executive producer credits on Quentin Tarantino's Django Unchained and Death Proof, and David O. Russell's Accidental Love.

Skotchdopole also executive produced four films for director Tony Scott: Man on Fire, Enemy of the State, The Fan, and Spy Game. Skotchdopole first worked with Scott in 1988 on Revenge, and later Days of Thunder, The Last Boy Scout, True Romance, and Crimson Tide.

Skotchdopole enjoyed a long collaboration with journalist, filmmaker and three-time Academy Award-nominated screenwriter Nora Ephron, having worked many times as her executive producer and as an associate producer on the box-office hit Sleepless in Seattle.

He cut his teeth in the industry by working with legendary directors Sir Richard Attenborough, Francis Ford Coppola, Brian De Palma, Richard Donner, John Frankenheimer, Paul Mazursky, Mike Nichols, Frank Oz, and John Schlesinger.

In 1984, Skotchdopole was the youngest member to be accepted into the Directors Guild of America. He is also a member of the Academy of Motion Picture Arts and Sciences and the Producers Guild of America.

Among his many credits, Skotchdopole has produced commercials for directors Sam Mendes, Oliver Stone and Samuel Bayer.

The surname "Skotchdopole" has Czech origin, and it means "Jump into field".

Filmography
He was a producer in all films unless otherwise noted.

Film

Second unit director or assistant director

Production manager

Miscellaneous crew

Thanks

Television

Production manager

Miscellaneous crew

References

External links 
 
 </ref>

Living people
American film producers
Producers who won the Best Picture Academy Award
Date of birth missing (living people)
Place of birth missing (living people)
Year of birth missing (living people)